Udawatte is both a surname and a given name. Notable people with the name include:
Mahela Udawatte (born 1986), Sri Lankan cricketer
Praba Udawatte (born 1980), Sri Lankan cricketer
Udawatte Nanda Thero, Sri Lankan politician

Sinhalese surnames